Günther Ulrich (born 10 May 1936) is an Austrian sabre fencer. He competed at the 1960 and 1972 Summer Olympics.

References

1936 births
Living people
Austrian male sabre fencers
Olympic fencers of Austria
Fencers at the 1960 Summer Olympics
Fencers at the 1972 Summer Olympics
Sportspeople from Nový Jičín
Moravian-German people
Austrian people of Moravian-German descent